Hemicholinium-3 (HC3), also known as hemicholine, is a drug which blocks the reuptake of choline by the high-affinity choline transporter (ChT; encoded in humans by the gene SLC5A7) at the presynapse. The reuptake of choline is the rate-limiting step in the synthesis of acetylcholine; hence, hemicholinium-3 decreases the synthesis of acetylcholine. It is therefore classified as an indirect acetylcholine antagonist.

Acetylcholine is synthesized from choline and a donated acetyl group from acetyl-CoA, by the action of choline acetyltransferase (ChAT). Thus, decreasing the amount of choline available to a neuron will decrease the amount of acetylcholine produced. Neurons affected by hemicholinium-3 must rely on the transport of choline from the soma (cell body), rather than relying on reuptake of choline from the synaptic cleft.

Toxicity
Hemicholinium-3 is highly toxic because it interferes with cholinergic neurotransmission. The LD50 of hemicholinium-3 for mice is about 35 μg.

See also 
Triethylcholine
Vesamicol

References 

Lactols
Phenylmorpholines 
Quaternary ammonium compounds
Acetylcholine synthesis inhibitors
Biphenyls